Epipleuria is a genus in the lady beetle family (Coccinellidae). It belongs to tribe Coccidulini of subfamily Coccidulinae, which is sometimes subsumed in the Coccinellinae as a tribe with the Coccidulini downranked to subtribe. As of 2005, two dozen species are known, all from the southern half of Africa.

The genus was only established in 2001, with the discovery of a number of beetles closely related to "Rhyzobius" epipleuralis but not actually part of the genus Rhyzobius.

Species
As of 2005, the species of Epipleuria are:

 Epipleuria caputabdita Fürsch, 2007
 Epipleuria endroedyi Fürsch, 2001
 Epipleuria epipleuralis (Pope, 1957)
 Epipleuria globosa Fürsch, 2001
 Epipleuria gussmannae Fürsch, 2001
 Epipleuria hirsutula Fürsch, 2007
 Epipleuria hirta Fürsch, 2007
 Epipleuria inexspectata Fürsch, 2001
 Epipleuria katbergensis Fürsch, 2001
 Epipleuria lapidaria Fürsch, 2007
 Epipleuria longissima Fürsch, 2001
 Epipleuria mahnerti Fürsch, 2001
 Epipleuria namaquaensis Fürsch, 2001
 Epipleuria natalensis Fürsch, 2001
 Epipleuria parcepunctata Fürsch, 2001
 Epipleuria parva Fürsch, 2001
 Epipleuria popei Fürsch, 2001
 Epipleuria punctillum  Fürsch, 2001
 Epipleuria rufosuturalis Fürsch, 2001
 Epipleuria rugata Fürsch, 2007
 Epipleuria ruthmuellerae Fürsch, 2007
 Epipleuria saxicola Fürsch, 2007
 Epipleuria trianguliloba Fürsch, 2001
 Epipleuria ventricosa Fürsch, 2001

Footnotes

References

  (2007): New species of Epipleuria Fürsch and Rhyzobius Stephens from southern Africa (Coleoptera: Coccinellidae: Coccidulini). Annals of the Transvaal Museum 44: 11–24. HTML abstract

Coccinellidae genera